Atlético Esperanzano is a Honduran football club based in La Esperanza, Honduras, founded in 1940 by lawyer José María Palacios Cantarero. The club currently plays in Liga de Ascenso.

Managers
 Rufino Domínguez
 Carlos Padilla
 Carlos Suazo
 Conrado Padilla
 Romualdo Bueso
 Narcizo Rodríguez (2011)

Football clubs in Honduras